The XR-3 Hybrid is a plug-in hybrid kit vehicle from Robert Q. Riley Enterprises.

The vehicle body is FRP/foam composite.

The vehicle is built from plans, with parts sourced by the builder, although a kit with pre-assembled parts may be sold sometime in the future.

As of March 27, 2021, their official website is suspended.  A member of Elio Owners Forum has reported that attempts to reach them on their facebook page were unsuccessful.

Powertrain and range 
The two front wheels are powered by the diesel or biodiesel internal combustion engine (ICE) and the single rear wheel is electric powered. The two power systems are ground-connected, meaning that they both drive wheels along the ground but are not connected at all within the vehicle, which allows owners to add and remove the diesel and electric propulsion systems separately and use either or both.

Price 
A duplicate of the Lithium-ion battery powered prototype will top $25,000, including $7,500 for batteries and an advanced DC  motor. Lead-acid batteries trim cost between $1,500 and $2,000. However, a diesel-only vehicle can be built for less than $10,000, and the modularity of the design allows an electric power train to be added easily later.

Safety 
It does not have airbags, large steel beam crumple zones, or an anti-lock braking system.

Notes

External links 
 

Plug-in hybrid vehicles
Kit cars
Three-wheeled motor vehicles